Estela is a small village in Puan Partido, Buenos Aires Province, Argentina.

Populated places in Buenos Aires Province